Blackwater is an unincorporated community in Lee County, Virginia, United States, along Virginia State Route 70  southeast of Jonesville. Its ZIP code is 24221.

History
A post office was established as Black Water in 1874. The community was named from Blackwater Creek.

References

Unincorporated communities in Lee County, Virginia
Unincorporated communities in Virginia